The Tauranga Cup is an annual New Zealand national open sailing competition for under 17 year-olds, sailing P Class dinghies. Many of New Zealand's top sailors have competed in and won the Tauranga Cup, including Dean Barker, Chris Dickson and Leslie Egnot.

The competition was first sailed in 1940, and the name comes from the fact that P Class yachts were originally sailed in Tauranga.

The national inter-provincial P Class competition for the Tanner Cup is normally sailed at the same venue.

List of winners

References

Yachting races
Sailing competitions in New Zealand
Recurring sporting events established in 1940